The 2010–11 BCHL season is the 49th season of the British Columbia Hockey League (BCHL). The regular season began on September 10, 2010 and ended on February 20, 2011.

At the end of the playoff season, the Vernon Vipers defeated the Powell River Kings in a 4–0 sweep to win the Fred Page Cup. The Vipers then continued on to win the Doyle Cup by defeating the Spruce Grove Saints in a 4–3 series. During the 2011 Royal Bank Cup run, the Vipers lost to the Pembroke Lumber Kings in the final round.

Changes 
The Williams Lake Timberwolves were declared in "bad standing" by the league and was indefinitely suspended.
The Burnaby Express move to Coquitlam, become the Coquitlam Express

Final standings

 
At end of regular season

2011 Fred Page Cup Playoffs

2011 Doyle Cup
The 2011 Doyle Cup was played between the BCHL champion Vernon Vipers and the AJHL champion Spruce Grove Saints

Game Results
Game 1: Spruce Grove 1 – 3 Vernon
Game 2: Spruce Grove 3 – 2 Vernon
Game 3: Spruce Grove 5 – 2 Vernon
Game 4: Vernon 3 – 1 Spruce Grove
Game 5: Vernon 3 – 2 Spruce Grove (OT)
Game 6: Vernon 0 – 2 Spruce GroveGame 7: Vernon 4' – 2 Spruce Grove

Vernon would then move on to the 2011 Royal Bank Cup, where they would finish in second place after losing to the Central Junior Hockey League's Pembroke Lumber Kings in the final.

Scoring leaders
The following players led the league in points at the conclusion of the regular season.

  GP = Games played; G = Goals; A = Assists; Pts = Points; PIM = Penalty minutes Leading goaltenders GP = Games played; Min = Minutes played; W = Wins; L = Losses; T = Ties; GA = Goals against; SO = Shutouts; SV% = Save percentage; GAA = Goals against averageBased on goaltenders with a minimum of 20 gamesAward WinnersWith the exception of the Brett Hull Trophy and goaltender awards, each award is given to two players; One in each conference.''

Brett Hull Trophy (Top Scorer): Mike Hammond (Salmon Arm)
Best Defenceman: Justin Dasilva (Powell River) & Joey Laleggia (Penticton)
Bruce Allison Memorial Trophy: Destry Straight (Coquitlam) & Bryce Gervais (Salmon Arm)
Bob Fenton Trophy (Most Sportsmanlike): Brad McGowan (Surrey) & Grayson Downing (Westside)
Top Goaltender (Lowest GAA with >1000 minutes played): Michael Garteig (Penticton)
Wally Forslund Memorial Trophy (Best Goaltending Duo): Michael Garteig & Sean Maguire (Penticton)
Vern Dye Memorial Trophy (regular-season MVP): Matt Garbowsky (Powell River) & Joey Laleggia (Penticton)
Joe Tennant Memorial Trophy (Coach of the Year): Kent Lewis (Powell River) & Tim Kehler (Salmon Arm)
Ron Boileau Memorial Trophy (Best Regular Season Record): Powell River Kings
Cliff McNabb Trophy (Coastal Conference Champions): Powell River Kings
Ryan Hatfield Trophy (Interior Conference Champions): Vernon Vipers
Fred Page Cup (League Champions): Vernon Vipers

Players Selected in 2011 NHL Entry Draft
Rd5 #140: Joel Lowry – Los Angeles Kings (Victoria Grizzlies)
Rd6 #160: Josh Manson – Anaheim Ducks (Salmon Arm Silverbacks)

See also
 Doyle Cup
 2011 Royal Bank Cup
 2010 in ice hockey
 2011 in ice hockey
 British Columbia Hockey League
 British Columbia Amateur Hockey Association
 Canadian Junior Hockey League

References

External links
Official website of the British Columbia Hockey League

BCHL
British Columbia Hockey League seasons